Ronald Allan "Ron" Rosenfeld is an American politician and housing expert. Rosenfeld has previously served in numerous U.S. federal and Oklahoma state government positions relating to housing. He served as chair of the Federal Housing Finance Board and president of the Government National Mortgage Association under president of the United States George W. Bush and as Oklahoma Secretary of Commerce under governor of Oklahoma Frank Keating.

Early life and career
Rosenfeld graduated from the Wharton School at the University of Pennsylvania and received his J.D. degree from Harvard Law School. He then began a career in real estate development and investment banking. In 1981, Rosenfeld became a partner for Prescott, Ball and Turbent, a regional investment banking firm headquartered in Cleveland, Ohio. When that firm was acquired by Kemper Financial Services, Rosenfeld became that firm's Executive Vice President.

George HW Bush Administration
In 1989, Republican vice president of the United States George H. W. Bush was elected president, defeating Democratic governor of Massachusetts Michael Dukakis. Following Bush's inauguration, Rosenfeld was appointed by Housing and Urban Development Secretary Jack Kemp as Deputy Assistant Secretary of Housing with the Federal Housing Administration. While with the FHA, Rosenfeld had responsibility for overseeing both single family and multifamily housing programs of the FHA. He was later appointed as Deputy Assistant Secretary for Corporate Finance with the Department of the Treasury by Treasury Secretary Nicholas F. Brady in 1992.

Private Sector
Rosenfeld left the federal government in 1993 to become the Executive Vice President of NHP, Inc., and President of the National Corporation for Housing Partnerships, a firm involved in ownership and management of affordable multifamily housing.

Keating Administration
Rosenfeld moved to Oklahoma in 1995. In 1997 Republican Governor of Oklahoma Frank Keating appointed Rosenfeld as his second Oklahoma Secretary of Commerce. As Commerce Secretary, Rosenfeld oversaw all state agencies responsible for promoting economic development, community development and workforce development.

Following the 1998 Oklahoma general elections, Rosenfeld resigned as Secretary and returned to Washington, D.C. to seek private work. Governor Keating appointed Howard Barnett Jr., a Tulsa businessman, to succeed him.

George W Bush Administration
After three years in the private sector, Ronseld returned to the federal government. In July 2001, Republican President of the United States George W. Bush appointed him as president of the Government National Mortgage Association. He remained as Ginnie Mae President until December 14, 2005, when President Bush, through recess appointment, designated him chairman of the Federal Housing Finance Board (FHFB). During Ronseld's tenure as chairman, the FHFB was merged with the Office of Federal Housing Enterprise Oversight to create the Federal Housing Finance Agency as a result of the enactment of the Housing and Economic Recovery Act of 2008. Rosenfeld continued to serve as chairman until his resignation on December 31, 2008.

Personal life
Rosenfeld is married to his wife Patti and they have six children.

References

Year of birth missing (living people)
State cabinet secretaries of Oklahoma
Living people
Wharton School of the University of Pennsylvania alumni
George W. Bush administration personnel
George H. W. Bush administration personnel
Harvard Law School alumni